This list of sound designers consists of notable sound designers for film, television, and theatre.

Sound designers
 Ben Burtt
 Suzanne Ciani
 Jack Foley
 Glenn Freemantle
 Theo Green
 Neil Hillman
 Richard Hymns
 Marc Jorgenson
 Ren Klyce
 Anthony Marinelli
 Walter Murch
 Cricket S. Myers
 Gareth Owen
 Bob Pomann
 Gary Rydstrom
 Frédéric Sanchez
 Alan Splet
 Randy Thom
 Dan Moses Schreier
 Sophie (musician)
 David Van Tieghem

Sound design engineers and inventors
 John S. Bowen
 Dan Dugan
 Bruce Jackson
 Pierre Schaeffer

See also
 Tony Award for Best Sound Design

 
Sound designers